Thomas A. Bussiere (born 1963) is a United States Air Force general who has served as commander of the Air Force Global Strike Command since December 7, 2022. He most recently served as the deputy commander of United States Strategic Command from 2020 to 2022. He attended St. Johnsbury Academy in Vermont (1981) and was commissioned in 1985 through ROTC at Norwich University. Bussiere previously served as Commander, Alaskan Command, United States Northern Command.

Awards and decorations

Effective dates of promotions

References

Living people
1963 births
Recipients of the Air Force Distinguished Service Medal
Recipients of the Defense Superior Service Medal
Recipients of the Legion of Merit